Rugosomyces carneus is a small pink-capped mushroom with white gills that can be found in grassy meadows, fields, or on lawns from spring to autumn in Europe and North America. Its common names include pink fairhead and pink domecap.

Taxonomy
Originally described as Agaricus carneus by the French mycologist Pierre Bulliard in 1792, this small pink mushroom has been through many taxonomical name changes over many years, and as a result has had many binomial names. A few of these are listed in the Synonyms section in the box at right. Its current specific epithet, carnea, is derived from the Latin for "flesh-coloured". The genus name is derived from the Ancient Greek terms kalos "pretty", and cubos "head".

Description
It is usually pale pink, but can be darker, pinker, or redder. It usually fades with age. At first it is convex, but later flattens, and has a tendency to become wavy. It is smooth and dry. The gills are adnexed to almost free; sometimes notched and are white, giving a spore print of the same colour. They are quite closely spaced initially. The flesh is white; with very little taste, or smell.

A similar species, Rugosomyces persicolor(Fr.) Singer, grows in tufts, has a liking for manured ground, and is sometimes recorded as a variety or variant of R. carneus.

Distribution and habitat
Rugosomyces carneus appears in spring, summer, and early autumn (usually after rain). It is frequent in Britain, Europe, Asia, and North America, growing in grassy meadows and fields and on lawns. It is very rarely found in woods, unless a grassy clearing is present. It seems to tolerate agricultural practices, because its fruiting bodies often appear on fertilized farmland.

Edibility
This mushroom is edible, but is unsubstantial, as it is small and thin fleshed. It is also potentially confused with poisonous species.

References

Fungi described in 1972
Fungi of Europe
Fungi of North America
Fungi of Asia
Lyophyllaceae
Edible fungi